Bowcraft Amusement Park or Bowcraft Playland was a small amusement park located on U.S. Route 22 West in Scotch Plains, New Jersey. At the time of its closing, it contained 21 rides appropriate for both children and adults. Bowcraft Amusement Park was open weekends from May through October and daily June through Labor Day.  

The park's history dates to 1946, when an archery and skiing enthusiast named Ted Miller opened a small archery and ski equipment store, complete with a small ski slope on-site, and named it Bowcraft Park.

In the 1980s, the park included a miniature golf course, which was eventually removed to make room for an overall expansion of both the park itself and the parking area.

The park offered a choice between purchasing tickets for individual rides, or an all-inclusive "Fun-Pass" which gives the ticket holder unlimited riding.

In 2016, a developer purchased the property with plans to demolish the park and build 190 apartments and 10 townhomes. The town of Scotch Plains scheduled a hearing to discuss the application for the planned property development on September 26, 2016. The park owners issued a statement saying that despite the planned development, closure was not imminent, and the park would open for the 2017 season in April as always.
The park permanently ceased operations in October 2018 and in the following month, all official park websites and social media pages were deactivated, and the park's rides were put up for sale on various websites.

Former Attractions/Rides

Kiddie Rides 
 Merry Go Round
 Frog Hopper
 Helicopters
 Big Trucks
 Motorcycle Jump
 Kiddie Boats

Family Rides 
 Balloon Ride
 Drop Zone
 Super Slide
 Train Xpress
 Speedway
 Popp
 Dragon Coaster (sold to Clementon Park and Splash World)
 Tilt A Whirl
 Bumper Cars

Thrill Rides 
 Galleon Pirate Ship (sold to Alabama Splash Adventure)
 Muzik Express
 Paratrooper
 Scrambler
 Crossbow roller coaster

Other Attractions 
Other attractions in the park included a children's play area, arcade, and midway carnival games.

Film appearances
The conclusion of the 1991 film Mortal Thoughts was filmed there, and the park is featured on the film's poster.
The opening scene from the 1994 movie North was filmed at Bowcraft.

References

External links 

Buildings and structures in Union County, New Jersey
Amusement parks in New Jersey
1970 establishments in New Jersey
Tourist attractions in Union County, New Jersey
Scotch Plains, New Jersey
Defunct amusement parks in New Jersey